Ladário is a municipality located in the Brazilian state of Mato Grosso do Sul.  The municipality of Ladário is surrounded by the municipality of Corumbá in all directions. Together, Corumbá and Ladário total 123,320 inhabitants.

A town with natural resources such as iron, manganese, limestone, sand and clay, Ladário is located in the western region of the state of Mato Grosso do Sul, in the heart of the Pantanal.

References

Municipalities in Mato Grosso do Sul